Peter Kováčik (born 1 December 2001) is a Slovak footballer who plays for Železiarne Podbrezová as a right-back.

Club career

FK Železiarne Podbrezová
Kováčik made his professional debut for Železiarne Podbrezová against ŠK Slovan Bratislava on 16 July 2022.

References

External links
 FK Železiarne Podbrezová official club profile 
 
 Futbalnet profile 
 

2001 births
Living people
Sportspeople from Banská Bystrica
Slovak footballers
Slovakia youth international footballers
Association football defenders
FK Železiarne Podbrezová players
Slovak Super Liga players
2. Liga (Slovakia) players